Nagojje is a town in the Buganda Region of Uganda. It is a municipality in Mukono District.

Location

The coordinates of Nagojje are 0°26'29.0"N, 32°53'00.0"E (Latitude:0.441389; Longitude:32.883333).

Points of interest
Nagojje is surrounded by a rural area where the main economic activity is agriculture. The main crop that is grown in the area is the cultivation of coffee. Both the Robusta and the more disease-resistant clonal variety are grown in the Nagojje neighborhood.

See also
 Lugazi
 Kayunga
 List of cities and towns in Uganda

References

External links
Website of Mukono District Local Government

Mukono District
Populated places in Central Region, Uganda